Club Sportif Constantinois, also known as CS Constantine  or simply CSC for short, is an Algerian football club based in Constantine, Algeria. The club was founded in 1929, and its colours are green and black.

CSC are known as The Smurfs, and nicknamed as The Dean (.)

Their home stadium, Stade Mohamed Hamlaoui, has a capacity of 40,000 spectators. The club is currently playing in the Algerian Ligue Professionnelle 1.

History
CS Constantine was officially founded under the name of Iqbal Association in 1898.  It was also named Chabab Mécanique de Constantine from 1977 to 1987.

Tassili Airlines the airlines firm of the petroleum company Sonatrach sponsored the club from 2012 to 2016. And since 2016, the club was sponsored by the Entreprise Nationale des Travaux aux Puits (ENTP), another firm of Sonatrach.

The 1990s and the first title of the championship 
For the second time in its history, the CSC succeeded in qualifying for the semi-final of the Algerian Cup in 1992, and lost to ASO Chlef (after shots on goal), at the Stade du 5 Juillet 1962. Two years later, the club snatched the title of league champion 2 for the 4th time, in this season the club dominated the D2 championship including the famous Constantine derby, the CSC beating the MO Constantine twice (3- 0 then 2-0). Promoted for the umpteenth time in 1994, the CSC won its first title in the history of Champion of Algeria during the 1996–97 season, with talented and experienced players at the national level (Isâad Bourahli nicknamed the fox of the surfaces from the 1990s. Moudoud Kaoua, Réda Matem, Salim Laïb, Hassen Ghoula and Sid Ahmed Benamara: international players and others). The same season, the CSC is a finalist in the international Black Stars tournament in Paris, after the semi-final victory over the Senegalese club ASC Diaraf. The following season (97-98), the club participated for the first time in the African Champions League. Exempted during the preliminary round of this edition the club, was eliminated against the Senegalese club AS Douanes in the first round, at the end of the season the CSC finishes 2nd in the championship of Algeria (Group A).

Colours and badge
Under all three names the club has had the same goals and values: (Popular, Islamic); the same colours: Green  (Hope) and black  (Grief); and the same motto: 'Hope in Grief' (L'esperance en Deuil).

Kits

Crests

Honours

Domestic competitions
 Algerian Ligue Professionnelle 1 
 Champion (2): 1996–97, 2017–18.
Runner-up : 1970-71.
 Ligue Professionnelle 2
Champion (6): 1969-70, 1976-77, 1985-86, 1993-94, 2003-04, 2010-11.
 Algerian Super Cup
Runner-up (1): 2018

Performance in CAF competitions
 CAF Champions League: 2 appearances
 1998 – First round
 2018–19 – Quarter-finals

 CAF Confederation Cup: 2 appearances 
 2014 – Second round
 2016 – Second round

CAF competitions stats

Grounds

CS Constantine's home stadium is Mohamed Hamlaoui known as Stade Chahid Hamlaoui which has been their home since its opening in 1976. The previous name of the stadium was Stade 17 Juin, the change was made in memory of Hamlaoui's death, a freedom fighter that died during the Algerian War. It can currently hold up to 40,000 people. The stadium has been through some renovation in the last few years. In 2007 natural grass was imported from the Netherlands.

Players
Algerian teams are limited to two foreign players. The squad list includes only the principal nationality of each player;

Current squad
As of 25 August 2022.

Reserve Squad

Personnel

Current technical staff

Notable players
Below are the notable former players who have represented CS Constantine in league and international competition since the club's foundation in 1926. To appear in the section below, a player must have played in at least 100 official matches for the club or represented the national team for which the player is eligible during his stint with CS Constantine or following his departure.

For a complete list of CS Constantine players, see :Category:CS Constantine players

 Mohamed Amroune 
 Fayçal Badji 
 Ousmane Berthé
 Yacine Bezzaz
 Hamza Boulemdaïs
 Noureddine Bounaas
 Issaad Bourahli
 Efosa Eguakun
 Hocine Fenier
 Hassen Ghoula
 Réda Matem
 Mourad Meghni
 Kaoua Mouloud
 Gilles Ngomo 
 Laïb Salim
 Cédric Si Mohamed
 Paulin Voavy
 Mounir Zeghdoud

Managers

Rival clubs
  MC Alger (Rivalry)
  JSM Skikda (Rivalry)
  MO Constantine (Derby)
  AS Khroub (Derby)
  ES Sétif (Derby)
  Club Africain (Rivalry)

References

External links

 Fanclub Website

 
Football clubs in Algeria
Association football clubs established in 1926
Constantine, Algeria
Algerian Ligue Professionnelle 1 clubs
Algerian Ligue 2 clubs
Sports clubs in Algeria